The Smithsonian Agreement, announced in December 1971, created a new dollar standard, whereby the currencies of a number of industrialized states were pegged to the US dollar. These currencies were allowed to fluctuate by 2.25% against the dollar. The Smithsonian Agreement was created when the Group of Ten (G-10) states (Belgium, Canada, France, Germany, Italy, Japan, the Netherlands, Sweden, the United Kingdom, and the United States) raised the price of gold to 38 dollars, an 8.5% increase over the previous price at which the US government had promised to redeem dollars for gold. In effect, the changing gold price devalued the dollar by 7.9%.

Background 
The Bretton Woods Conference of 1944 established an international fixed exchange rate system based on the gold standard, in which currencies were pegged to the United States dollar, itself convertible into gold at $35/ounce.

A negative balance of payments, growing public debt incurred by the Vietnam War and Great Society programs, and monetary inflation by the Federal Reserve caused the dollar to become increasingly overvalued in the 1960s. The drain on US gold reserves culminated with the London Gold Pool collapse in March 1968.

On August 15, 1971, US President Richard Nixon unilaterally suspended the convertibility of US dollars into gold. The United States had deliberately offered this convertibility in 1944; it was put into practice by the U.S. Treasury. The suspension made the dollar effectively a fiat currency.

Nixon's administration subsequently entered negotiations with industrialized allies to reassess exchange rates following this development.

Meeting in December 1971 at the Smithsonian Institution in Washington D.C., the Group of Ten signed the Smithsonian Agreement. The US pledged to peg the dollar at $38/ounce (instead of $35/ounce; in other words: the USD rate lost 7.9%) with 2.25% trading bands, and other countries agreed to appreciate their currencies versus the dollar: Yen +16.9%; Deutsche Mark +13.6%, French Franc +8.6%, British pound the same, Italian lira +7.5%. The group also planned to balance the world financial system using special drawing rights alone.

Development 
Although the Smithsonian Agreement was hailed by President Nixon as a fundamental reorganization of international monetary affairs, it failed to encourage discipline by the Federal Reserve or the United States government.  The dollar price in the gold free market continued to cause pressure on its official rate; and soon after a 10% devaluation was announced on 14 February 1973, Japan and the OEEC countries decided to let their currencies float. A decade later, all industrialized states had done the same.

See also 
 Bretton Woods system
 Exchange rate
 Floating currency
 History of money
 ISO 4217
 Japanese yen
 Sherman Silver Purchase Act
 Snake in the tunnel
 United States Mint

References

Further reading 
 Otmar Emminger: Das Smithsonian Agreement - eine international abgestimmte Korrektur der Währungsparitäten. A chapter in: ''D-Mark, Dollar, Währungskrisen. Erinnerungen eines ehemaligen Bundesbankpräsidenten. DVA 1986,  (Emminger's autobiography)

External links 
 Britannica

Foreign exchange market
1971 in economics
December 1971 events in the United States
Smithsonian Institution
1971 in international relations